Donato Oliverio (Cosenza, 5 March 1956) is the Bishop of the Eparchy of Lungro, a diocese of the Italo-Albanian Catholic Church in Calabria, Italy. He replaced the most rev. Ercole Lupinacci.

Episcopal genealogy
 Archbishop Nilo Isvoroff
 Bishop Michael Petkov 
 Archbishop Michael Mirov
 Eparch Isaias Papadopoulos
 Eparch Giovanni Mele 
 Eparch Giovanni Stamati 
 Eparch Ercole Lupinacci
 Eparch Donato Oliverio

References

External links 
Eparchy's Bishop page 

Italian Eastern Catholic bishops
Italian people of Arbëreshë descent
1956 births
Living people
People from Cosenza